Rosina Anselmi ( 26 July 1880 – 23 May 1965) was an Italian stage, television and film actress. She was a prominent actress in the Sicilian language theater, especially in the province of Catania.

Life and career 
Born in Caltagirone, Catania into a family of stage actors, Anselmi began acting with her father Alessandro, then with Nino Martoglio in some comedies written by him. She then joined the stage company of Mimi Aguglia, another important actress of the Sicilian repertoire, with whom she toured in North America. Anselmi  went back to Sicily in 1910, and in 1914 she became the first actress, in spite of her status of a great character actress, alongside Angelo Musco with whom she acted for about thirty years, until Musco's death. Anselmi later continued her stage career next to Michele Abbruzzo, proposing the identical repertoire of Musco, until her death. She was a co-founder of the Teatro Stabile di Catania.

Selected filmography
 The Matchmaker (1934)
 Aldebaran (1935)
 Territorial Militia (1935)
 King of Diamonds (1936)
 Abandon All Hope (1937)
 The Ferocious Saladin (1937)
 A Lady Did It (1938)
 The Marquis of Ruvolito (1939)

References

External links 

1880 births
1965 deaths
People from Caltagirone
Italian stage actresses
Italian television actresses
Italian film actresses
20th-century Italian actresses
Actors from Sicily